The 2016 FIFA U-17 Women's World Cup was the fifth edition of the FIFA U-17 Women's World Cup, the biennial international women's youth football championship contested by the under-17 national teams of the member associations of FIFA. The tournament was held in Jordan from 30 September to 21 October 2016.

While the role of women in sport was regarded as controversial due to cultural and religious conservatism in some countries of the Middle East, this tournament was the first female FIFA tournament held in the region.

Host selection
The following countries submitted a bid to host the tournament by the May 2013 deadline:

On 5 December 2013, the FIFA Executive Committee announced that the tournament would be held in Jordan.

Qualified teams
A total of 16 teams qualified for the final tournament. In addition to Jordan who qualified automatically as hosts, the other 15 teams qualified from six separate continental competitions. The slot allocation was published in June 2014.

1.Teams that made their debut.

Venues
The three host cities were Amman, Irbid, and Zarqa. The infrastructure of the stadiums and surrounding areas in the host cities was developed. Greater Amman Municipality and the Higher Council for Youth were responsible for developing the infrastructure, with 30% under the responsibility of the municipality and 70% under the responsibility of the council.

Emblem
The official emblem was unveiled on 3 May 2015, which was designed to showcase Jordan's most iconic symbols. Visual aspects of the Jordanian culture can be seen on the emblem that has the traditional shape of the FIFA U-17 Women's World Cup Trophy, which include; the distinctive pattern of the Jordanian Keffieh, the Jordanian national flower Black Iris, Pan Arab colors and a star from the Jordanian flag.

Mascot
In a FIFA press conference on 28 May 2016, the tournament mascot, "Aseela", was introduced. Aseela is an Arabian oryx, which is a rare animal that happens to be the national animal of Jordan. The Arabian Oryx was chosen for being a symbol of " strength, gentleness, and athleticism", resembling female football players. The mascot is expected to inspire young women across Jordan and the region to participate in watching the tournament.

Theme Song 
The Official song for the 2016 FIFA Women U-17 World Cup is 'Jordan our Playground' Composed by Lebanese Singer Carole Samaha and her Jordanian counterpart Hussein Al Salman

Squads 

Each team named a squad of 21 players (three of whom must be goalkeepers) by the FIFA deadline. All players must be born on or after 1 January 1999, and on or before 31 December 2001. The official squads were announced on 23 September 2016.

Match officials
A total of 16 referees, 1 reserve referee, and 28 assistant referees were appointed by FIFA for the tournament.

Draw
The official draw was held on 30 May 2016, 18:00 EEST (UTC+3), at the Al Hussein Cultural Centre in Amman. The teams were seeded based on their performances in previous U-17 Women's World Cups and confederation tournaments, with the hosts Jordan automatically seeded and assigned to position A1. Teams of the same confederation could not meet in the group stage.

Group stage
The match schedule was approved by the FIFA Executive Committee on 25 May 2015, and officially announced on 10 August 2015.

The top two teams of each group advance to the quarter-finals. The rankings of teams in each group are determined as follows:

If two or more teams are equal on the basis of the above three criteria, their rankings are determined as follows:

All times are local, EEST (UTC+3).

Group A

Group B

Group C

Group D

Knockout stage
In the knockout stages, if a match is level at the end of normal playing time, a penalty shoot-out is used to determine the winner (no extra time is played).

Quarter-finals

Semi-finals

Third place match

Final

Winners

Goalscorers
8 goals

 Lorena Navarro

5 goals

 Ri Hae-yon
 Deyna Castellanos

4 goals

 Riko Ueki

3 goals

 Georgia Stanway
 Giulia Gwinn
 Jun Endo
 Sakura Nojima
 Hana Takahashi
 Hannah Blake
 Kim Pom-ui
 Eva Navarro
 Civana Kuhlmann
 Ashley Sanchez

2 goals

 Lena Oberdorf
 Gifty Acheampong
 Sandra Owusu-Ansah
 Saori Takarada
 Jazmín Enrigue
 Daniela Espinosa
 Lizbeth Ovalle
 Sam Tawharu
 Ja Un-yong
 Clàudia Pina
 Frankie Tagliaferri

1 goal

 Kerolin
 Micaelly
 Claudia Dabda
 Soline Djoubi
 Alexandra Takounda
 Jordyn Huitema
 Deanne Rose
 Sarah Stratigakis
 Hannah Taylor
 Ellie Brazil
 Alessia Russo
 Klara Bühl
 Remina Chiba
 Oto Kanno
 Hinata Miyazawa
 Sarah Abu-Sabbah
 Verónica Avalos
 Dayana Cázares
 Gabriela Juárez
 Jimena López
 Celiana Torres
 Ko Kyong-hui
 Sung Hyang-sim
 Limpia Fretes
 Laia Aleixandri
 Natalia Ramos
 Kiara Pickett
 Maria Cazorla
 Yerliane Moreno

Own goal

 Lucía Rodríguez (against Japan)

Awards
The following awards were given for the tournament:

References

External links
FIFA U-17 Women's World Cup Jordan 2016, FIFA.com
FIFA Technical Report 

2016 in Jordanian sport
2016 in women's association football
2016 in youth sport
2016
2016 FIFA U-17 Women's World Cup
October 2016 sports events in Asia
September 2016 sports events in Asia
2016 in youth association football